William Brian Jory (26 April 1919 – 27 December 2007) was an  Australian rules footballer who played with North Melbourne in the Victorian Football League (VFL).

Notes

External links 

1919 births
2007 deaths
Australian rules footballers from Victoria (Australia)
North Melbourne Football Club players